Lutheran Health Network is a healthcare provider and one of the largest employers in the northeast region of Indiana in the United States. The foundation has more than 7,000 employees working together with the more than 800 physicians who make up its medical staffs. The network's more than 100 access points in northern Indiana include physician offices, urgent care clinics, outpatient centers and eight hospitals consisting of 973 licensed beds - 797 in Allen County alone.

Lutheran Health Network is a subsidiary of Community Health Systems.

Centers 
 Lutheran Hospital 
 Lutheran Downtown Hospital
 Dupont Hospital 
 Lutheran Children's Hospital 
 The Orthopedic Hospital of Lutheran Health Network 
 Rehabilitation Hospital of Fort Wayne 
 Bluffton Regional Medical Center 
 Kosciusko Community Hospital 
 Dukes Memorial Hospital 
 RediMed  / MedStat 
 Lutheran Health Physicians

References

External links
Lutheran Health Network

Hospital networks in the United States
Medical and health organizations based in Indiana
Community Health Systems
Companies based in Fort Wayne, Indiana